Burrishoole is one of the nine baronies of County Mayo in Ireland. It is named after the former Gaelic territory of Umhaill, which also included Murrisk barony, and roughly means the "borough of Umhaill".

Legal context
Baronies were created after the Norman invasion of Ireland as subdivisions of counties and were used for administration. While baronies continue to be officially defined units, they have been administratively obsolete since 1898. However, they continue to be used in land registration and specification such as in planning permissions. In some areas, usage of the barony name is common, while in other areas barony names have fallen out of use altogether. In many cases, a barony corresponds to an earlier Gaelic tuath which had submitted to the English Crown.

Burrishoole is one of the nine baronies of County Mayo. It includes a widespread area from Newport in the east through Mulranny on the north side of Clew Bay and out to Achill Island in the west.

Towns in the Barony of Burrishoole
Newport, County Mayo
Keel, Achill
Achill Sound
Mulranny
Dugort
Westport

Notable people
Jason Doherty
Manus O'Donell
Henry Butler, Lord of Umallia

References

Baronies of County Mayo